The term Romanian decorations may refer to one of the following:

 Orders, decorations, and medals of Romania, orders and medals currently awarded by the President of Romania, known by law as The National Decorations System
 Decorations of the Romanian Armed Forces, honorific distinctions currently awarded by the Ministry of National Defense
 Decorations of the Romanian Orthodox Church, crosses awarded by the Patriarch of All Romania and by the Metropolitans
 Decorations of the Romanian Royal House, orders and medals awarded by King Mihai I of Romania

Orders, decorations, and medals of Romania